Choi Ji-hee and Han Na-lae were the defending champions, but lost in the quarterfinals to Laura Pigossi and Wang Yafan.

Lara Arruabarrena and Tatjana Maria won the title, defeating Hayley Carter and Luisa Stefani in the final, 7–6(9–7), 3–6, [10–7].

Seeds

Draw

Draw

References

External Links
Draw

Korea Open - Doubles
2019 Doubles
2019 Korea Open